Burlănești is a commune in Edineț district, Moldova. It is composed of two villages, Burlănești and Buzdugeni.

References

Communes of Edineț District
Hotin County
Ținutul Suceava